Najafgarh is a town in the South West Delhi district of National Capital Territory of Delhi, India. It is one of the three subdivisions of the Southwest Delhi district. Najafgarh is located in south western part of Delhi sharing its territory with Gurugram and Bahadurgarh, Haryana.

History

Najafgarh was named after Mirza Najaf Khan (1723–1782) the commander-in-chief of the Mughal Army under King Shah Alam II. He marched several kilometers from the capital of Shahjahanabad to establish a military outpost, which would guard Delhi against attacks by British, Rohillas and Sikhs. He built a strong fort, in the suburbs beyond the capital city, and settled a small number of the Mughal here. That fort was later named Najafgarh. After the death of Najaf Khan, Najafgarh later became a fortified stronghold of the Rohilla Afghan chieftain Zabita Khan (b. 1785).

During the Indian Rebellion of 1857, and as a part of the Siege of Delhi, the Battle of Najafgarh took place on 25 August 1857 between Indian rebels and East India Company soldiers. Approximately 800 people were killed. After the defeat of the Mughal troops in 1857, Delhi came under the control of the British Empire in 1858. Najafgarh became a part of Delhi district of the Delhi Division of Punjab Province. Delhi was transferred from the North-Western Provinces (later the United Provinces) to Punjab by the British Government in 1859.

In 1861, the North-Western Provinces education system was abolished in Delhi, and a new system for schools modelled on the Punjab education system was introduced by W.M. Holroyd, the Inspector of Schools for the Ambala Division. New schools were opened at Narela, Najafgarh, Mehrauli and their suburbs. Several schools were opened in the following decades. The Delhi Normal School was shifted to Najafgarh from Kashmere Gate in 1911. The Delhi Normal School, with a small attached Model School, trained its teachers in closer accordance with European methods than any other Normal School in Northern India.

In 1947, Najafgarh became a part of independent India and fell under the union territory of Delhi. Najafgarh Assembly Constituency was established in 1993 when the Delhi legislative assembly was re-established after the Constitution (Sixty-ninth Amendment Act, 1991) came into force. This declared the Union Territory of Delhi to be formally known as National Capital Territory of Delhi. Najafgarh is now one of the most populous electoral regions in the National Capital Region of India (NCR). Najafgarh is surrounded by 70 villages bordering Haryana.

Geography

Najafgarh Drain, the continuation of the Sahibi River and an elongation of the Najafgarh Lake is the Indian capital's most polluted body of water due to the direct inflow of untreated sewage from surrounding populated areas. A January 2005 report by the Central Pollution Control Board classifies this drain, with 13 other highly polluted wetlands, under category ‘‘D’’ for assessing the water quality of wetlands in wildlife habitats.

Demographics 
As of 2011 India census, the population of Najafgarh is 1,365,152. Female sex Ratio is of 872 against Delhi's average of 868. Moreover, the Child Sex Ratio in Najafgarh is around 832 compared to Delhi's average of 871. The majority of the inhabitants are locals others are from Haryana, Uttrakhand, Punjab, Himachal Pradesh, Bihar and Uttar Pradesh. The literacy rate is 88.1%. Schedule Caste (SC) constitutes 12.60% of total population in Najafgarh.

Politics 
Kailash Gahlot, Advocate of the Aam Aadmi Party is MLA from Najafgarh Assembly constituency. Gahlot defeated former MLA Bharat Singh of the INLD in the 2015 Delhi Legislative Assembly election. Gahlot holds the post of Parliamentary Secretary, Government of NCT of Delhi.

Najafgarh Assembly constituency is part of the West Delhi (Lok Sabha constituency). Pravesh Verma of BJP is the MP representing the parliamentary constituency.

Transport
Indira Gandhi International Airport is the nearest international Airport to Najafgarh.

Najafgarh is connected by roads with major destinations all over Delhi and Haryana. The DTC (Delhi Transport Corporation) and DIMTS (Delhi Multi-Model Transit System) provide bus services from Najafgarh Bus Terminal to the other parts of Delhi. In October 2019, a new metro line called the Grey Line was linked from Dwarka to Najafgarh, taking the rapid transit system to the area for the first time. The line was further extended to Dhansa Bus Stand in September 2021, thereby linking the interior rural areas of Najafgarh.

Landmarks
 Najafgarh drain, Delhi
 Najafgarh drain bird sanctuary, Delhi
 Najafgarh Lake

Notable People
Ch. Brahm Prakash Yadav: first chief minister of Delhi.
Virender Sehwag: Cricketer, born in Najafgarh
Sushil Kumar: Wrestler, born in Baprola Village, Najafgarh
 Krishna Yadav won the Nari Shakti Puraskar for her business here.

References 

Neighbourhoods in Delhi
District subdivisions of Delhi
Cities and towns in South West Delhi district